Shishunaga (IAST: Śiśunāga, or Shusunaga) (c. 413 – 395 BCE) was the founder of the Shishunaga dynasty of the Magadha Empire in the present day northern India. Initially, he was an amatya (official) of the Magadha empire under the Haryanka dynasty. He was placed on the throne by the people who revolted against the Haryanka dynasty rule. According to the Puranas, he placed his son at Varanasi and himself ruled from Girivraja (Rajagriha). He was succeeded by his son Kalashoka (Kakavarna).

Early life
According to the Mahavamsatika, Shishunaga was a son of a Licchavi ruler of Vaishali. He was conceived by a nagara-shobhini and brought up an officer of state. At the time of the revolt, he was a viceroy at Varanasi of king Nagadasaka, the last ruler of the Haryanka dynasty.

Reign
Shishunaga ruled from 413 BCE to 395 BCE. Initially, his capital was Rajagriha and Vaishali was his second royal residence. Later he shifted his capital to Vaishali. He conquered Avanti kingdom by defeating Nandivardhana or Avantivardhana, the last king of Pradyota dynasty. The Magadhan victory must have been helped by the revolution that placed Aryaka on the throne of Ujjayini.

The Puranas tell us that he placed his son at Varanasi and himself ruled from Girivraja (Rajagriha).

Expansion
He destroyed Pradyota dynasty of Avanti and conquered kingdoms of Kosala and Vatsa.

Successor
He was succeeded by his son Kalashoka (Kakavarna).

See also
Avanti-Magadhan Wars

References

Citations

Sources
 
 
 
 
 

4th-century BC Indian monarchs
Kings of Magadha